{{Infobox television station
| callsign = WAPA-TV
| city = 
| logo = WAPA-TV logo.svg
| logo_size = 200px
| logo_alt = In lowercase in a geometric sans serif in black, the letters "w a p a" next to a motif of three red stripes echoing those in Puerto Rico's flag.
| branding = 
| digital = 27 (UHF)
| virtual = 4
| translators = {{ubl|WNJX-TV 31 Mayagüez|WTIN-TV 14 Ponce}}
| affiliations           = 
| airdate = 
| location = San Juan, Puerto Rico
| former_channel_numbers = Analog: 4 (VHF, 1954–2009)
| former_affiliations = 
| owner = (InterMedia Partners, 84%)| licensee = 
| sister_stations = 
| erp = 1,000 kW (CP)585.9 kW (STA)
| haat = 
| facility_id = 52073
| coordinates = 
| licensing_authority = FCC
| website = 
| embed_header = Satellite station
| embedded = 
}}

WAPA-TV (channel 4) is a Spanish-language independent television station in San Juan, Puerto Rico. WAPA-TV's studios are located on Avenida Luis Vigoreaux in Guaynabo, and its transmitter is located at the WKAQ-TV (channel 2) transmission tower at Cerro La Santa in Cayey near the Bosque Estatal de Carite mountain reserve.

The station's signal is relayed across Puerto Rico through two full-power satellite stations: WTIN-TV (digital channel 14, virtual channel 4) in Ponce and WNJX-TV (digital channel 31, virtual channel 4) in Mayagüez. WTIN-TV also broadcasts two subchannels simulcast from WKAQ-TV, including its Telemundo programming, using virtual channels 2.11 and 2.21.

History
WAPA-TV began broadcasting on May 1, 1954, as the second television station to be licensed to Puerto Rico. Its callsign is a partial abbreviation of the station's original owners, the now-defunct Asociación de Productores de Azúcar, or Puerto Rico Sugar Grower's Association. During its earliest years, the station was affiliated with NBC, ABC, DuMont, and the CMQ Television Network.

The station was the first in the U.S. territory to transition to color unceremoniously in 1966, followed by WKAQ-TV in 1968. Popularly known in Puerto Rico by its assigned channel number, Canal Cuatro, the station was also known by its animated cartoon mascot during the 1970s and 1980s, a bongo-playing cat (known commonly as el gato de WAPA in Spanish) and therefore its slogan was Por el cuatro como el gato (colloquially "on four (legs) like the cat"), which rhymes in its original Spanish. Similarly, another station promo used the phrase, Hasta el gato, te-ve el cuatro and the cat itself was alternately known as el Gato de Cuatro.Like other mascots, El Gato was seen in different situations in different on-air promos. Besides playing the bongos, he would also play the drums and was seen in one station ID as a matador. Another promo had him interacting with a cat seen in a Telemundo ad. El Gato would also sometimes be accompanied by his wife and children (one boy and one girl), where they appeared flying in a helicopter shaped like the channel's "4" logo and celebrated the holidays while playing musical instruments.

WAPA-TV's competitors include WKAQ-TV (Telemundo), WLII (Univision affiliate station Teleonce) and PBS member station WIPR-TV. WAPA-TV and WKAQ-TV have battled for the title of Puerto Rico's most-watched television station since the 1950s, with WLII entering the battle in the mid-1980s.

During the 1980s and early 1990s, the station became very successful by mixing American shows translated to Spanish with locally produced sitcoms such as Cuqui, Cara o Cruz, Entrando por la Cocina, Carmelo y Punto and Barrio Cuatro Calles. But it still trailed behind WKAQ-TV as the second most-watched Puerto Rican station. In the early 1990s, WAPA rebranded itself with the slogans WAPA'lla! (a catchy slang variation of Vamos pa'lla, or "Let's go!") and WAPA, aqui con la gente ("WAPA, here with the people"). These slogans were accompanied by a catchy musical score and vivid, colorful graphics depicting the channel's logo. In 1994, WAPA was the first television station in Puerto Rico to use high-end graphic animations to animate a new logo, created and animated by Pixel Light Studios of New York City. This gave the station a very "American" on-air appearance. The logo, although graphically pleasing, was slowly dropped in favor of the classical number 4 logo. High end graphics were later dropped altogether for cheaper, in-house graphics.

In 1997, under the helm of former Univision executive Miguel Banojian, WAPA-TV achieved its biggest increases in viewership ever. During Banojian's tenure, the network produced more local programming than ever before, increasing its local news programming, and broadcasting several sporting events including Serie del Caribe (the Caribbean edition of the U.S. baseball World Series) and World Boxing Championship events produced in partnership (since the early 1980s) with Don King (WAPA would also sometimes broadcast fights promoted by King's rival Bob Arum and other promoters like Bob Andreoli).

In 1998, WAPA again rebranded itself with a new name and logo; Televicentro (a brand that was used previously during the 1970s and 1980s). It also regained its position as a major Puerto Rican television station, mainly due to its new focus on locally produced programming. Its new slogan, Como tú, boricua ("Like you, Puerto Rican"—a nod to the longtime colloquial nickname for Puerto Ricans) highlighted the fact that it was the only local commercial station remaining in Puerto Rico that was programmed locally. Despite the new name, local residents still referred to the station as either el cuatro or simply "WAPA". That same year, former WKAQ-TV general manager Joe Ramos was named president of WAPA-TV.

In September 2004, WAPA-TV became the first Puerto Rican station, and the seventh television station in the U.S. (including territories) to become a satellite-distributed superstation. WAPA America can be seen in the U.S. mainland through DirecTV and Dish Network, and on various cable television providers including Xfinity, Spectrum, Verizon FiOS and Optimum but this is not the first time WAPA-TV has had any presence in the United States. In 1968, WAPA-TV had WNJU-TV Channel 47 not only as its sister station but also as its affiliate, predating WAPA America by decades. WNJU-TV was owned by Screen Gems before selling it in 1984 to a consortium that would launch the NetSpan network, later evolving into Telemundo.

On October 19, 2006. LIN TV announced that it had entered into an agreement to sell its Puerto Rico television operations to InterMedia Partners for $130 million in cash. The sale was completed on March 30, 2007.

On December 17, 2007, the station changed its branding from Televicentro to wapa, in lowercase letters. Following the rebrand, the station began developing a new format, changing its jingle and redesigning their website. WAPA-TV signed an agreement with Miss Puerto Rico Universe to produce a reality show titled Por la corona, which debuted on August 15, 2008, where the public is able to select which five of the participants move directly to the pageant's semifinal via text messaging votes.

On January 23, 2013, InterMedia Partners announced that it would merge WAPA-TV and WAPA America, along with its stake in Cinelatino, with the shell corporation Azteca Acquisition Corporation (which is not associated with the Mexican-based Azteca group or the Azteca América network) to form Hemisphere Media Group. 73% of the new company is owned by InterMedia.

On December 1, 2017, WAPA-TV named Javier Maynulet Montilla as president and general manager, succeeding Ramos, who spent 20 years at the station until his retirement on April 27, 2018.

On November 9, 2020, WAPA-TV named Jorge Hidalgo as president and general manager of the station effective January 1, 2021, after Javier Maynulet leaves the station after 2 years. Hidalgo currently serves as a Senior Vicepresident of Operations for Hemisphere Media Group. He has more than 40 years of broadcast experience in Hispanic television.

Outages
On December 3, 2015, WAPA-TV along with WIPR-TV went off-air, due to a transmitter outage at Cerro La Santa in Cayey. The station was still watchable on Liberty, Dish Network, DirecTV and Claro TV. The transmitter was repaired and placed back on air on December 10, 2015. Repairs were made by WAPA's Engineering Department.

On September 20, 2017, the main transmission tower of WAPA-TV was destroyed during Hurricane Maria. This caused the station to be off-air for two days until they began transmitting through Univision-owned stations WSTE-DT (until October 30) and WLII-DT (until November 17; which was owned by Univision at the time) from their transmitter in Aguas Buenas. Since November 18, the station then began transmitting its main programming (virtual channel 4.1) through Telemundo-owned station WKAQ-TV and WAPA Deportes (4.2) through Government-owned WIPR-TV.

On October 28, 2018, one year after going dark, WAPA-TV returned to the air from its new transmitter installed at the WKAQ-TV tower location, broadcasting with High Quality Doble Data HD. Repairs caused by the old transmitter equipment were made by the engineering department.

DirecTV-WAPA carriage dispute
On May 4, 2018, Hemisphere Media Group became involved in a retransmission consent dispute with DirecTV, resulting in WAPA-TV's removal from DirecTV's Puerto Rico channel lineup. The station was restored on June 14, 2018, after the two sides came to a new agreement.

Dish-WAPA carriage dispute
On October 24, 2019, at 7 p.m., Hemisphere Media Group became involved in a retransmission consent dispute with Dish Network, resulting in WAPA-TV's removal from Dish's Puerto Rico channel lineup. The station was restored on December 17, 2019, after the two sides came to a new agreement.

Programming

NotiCentroNotiCentro (a Spanish translation of NewsCenter) is the name of WAPA-TV's news division; the station presently broadcasts 44 hours of locally produced newscasts each week (with eight hours each weekday and two hours each on Saturdays and Sundays). The news operation began in 1967 with Cuban-born Evelio Otero as the sole anchorman for the 6:00 p.m. newscast. Soon after, Carlos Ruben Ortiz joined the news staff for the 6:00 p.m. broadcast. Otero remained alone on camera, until his departure from WAPA in 1980 to take the senior editor position at the Voice of America in Washington. Ortiz shared the anchor slot at 6:00 p.m. with then newcomer Guillermo José Torres, a former radio announcer born in Juana Díaz, Puerto Rico who has since become the longest standing news anchor on the island, with a career spanning 43 years (Torres retired on August 5, 2013). The format predated the NewsCenter format which became popular on NBC affiliates in the 1970s.

In its beginnings, NotiCentro 4 ran for only fifteen minutes in the afternoon, with a half-hour edition at 10:00 p.m.; there was also a weekend edition. Gradually, the program's running time was increased to a full hour. After Otero's departure, New York City-born William "Bill" Pérez became WAPA's news director (Torres held the post for a while, but eventually asked to serve only as a news anchor). In the late 1970s, Enrique Cruz, Luz Nereida Vélez, Sylvia Gómez, Luis Rigual, Cyd Marie Fleming, José Esteves, Luis Francisco Ojeda and others joined the news department.

In 1980, NotiCentro 4 inaugurated a new studio. In 1981, Pedro Rosa Nales joined the team. In 1982, Enrique Cruz Díaz, also known as "Kike Cruz", replaced Torres as show director. In 1983, Rigual died, and was replaced as main sports anchor by Rafael Bracero. Bobby Angleró joined the team of reporters as Bracero's main helper in 1983, the same year that the Coquí Satellite was inaugurated by the station. Coquí Satellite helped the station deliver breaking news quicker, and helped deliver the news on occasions such as the Challenger explosion, when Torres interrupted Ángela Meyer on her Chanita Gobernadora comedy section to break the news to the public only minutes after it had happened.

In the early 2000s, WAPA-TV began using, a helicopter for newsgathering called SuperCóptero ("SuperChopper"). The SuperCóptero had mostly been used to report on traffic conditions in the metropolitan area on the 4:00 p.m. and 5:00 p.m. newscasts. WAPA-TV was the only local station to have a helicopter, but regular use of the SuperCóptero was soon discontinued due to budget cuts; WAPA now only uses the helicopter for special events such as elections and breaking news coverage.NotiCentro ran a local cable channel, WAPA Tiempo, which featured weather forecasts for Puerto Rico 24 hours a day. Originally named El Canal del Tiempo (its name changed to avoid confusion with The Weather Channel cable network), it could be seen on all three cable companies then serving Puerto Rico at the time (OneLink Communications, Adelphia Puerto Rico, and Choice Cable TV; all of them now merged as Liberty Puerto Rico); it was also broadcast on WAPA-TV digital subchannel 4.3. WAPA Tiempo was discontinued on September 1, 2012, due to WAPA Deportes (subchannel 4.2) upgrading to Full HD resolution to broadcast MLB postseason games; the channel was also dropped from Liberty cable.

WAPA-TV uses the same logo for NotiCentro (formerly NotiCentro 4), changing the word WAPA to NotiCentro, but with the same red strips at the right. The music package previously used for the newscast was "News Authority" by 615 Music and has been used since 2004. In the past, the station used "WNDU 1986 News Theme", "Turn to News", "Newswatch 24", "News One" and "Impact" among others. NotiCentro now uses the same music for all its segments and bumpers except for its news résumé En Una Semana ("In One Week"), which used the NotiCentro 4 graphics and music package from 1999 but now uses the current graphics and music package. Since 2012, WAPA-TV uses the "Truth" music package by 615 Music with "Truth V1" from 2012 to 2017, and "Truth V2" since 2017 for all newscasts.

On May 20, 2019, NotiCentro expanded to 1½ hours beginning at 4:00 p.m., renaming itself as NotiCentro Edición Estelar, with Normando Valentín serving as an anchor for the early evening newscast. Valentín has been with the station since 2003, and was morning anchor from 2008 to 2019. On February 3, 2020, Katiria Soto returns to WAPA-TV after five years working at WXTV-DT in New York, this time as a co-anchor of the 4 o'clock newscast.

Notable current on-air news staff
 Pedro Rosa Nales – anchor and reporter
 Luz Nereida Vélez – health reporter
 Ángel Rosa – political analyst
 Juan Dalmau – political analyst
 Jay Fonseca – general assignment reporter/analyst

Local program hosts
 Angelique Burgos –  Burbu Nite Melwin Cedeño – Pégate Al MediodíaJunior Abrams - Pégate Al Mediodía (Host at Analisis Neutral With Eleuterio Quiñones)
 Jailene Cintrón – Pégate Al Mediodía Jaime Mayol - Viva la Tarde Alba Nydia Díaz – Viva la Tarde Rafael José – Viva la Tarde Sunshine Logroño – Pégate Al Mediodía, El Remix (producer)
 Marian Pabón – El RemixNotable former on-air staff
 Guillermo José Torres – anchorman (now retired)
 Rafael Bracero – sports anchor (previously at WLII-DT, now retired)
 Rubén Sánchez – (later at WJPX, WLII-DT and WTCV, now at WKAQ 580AM)
 Juan Manuel García Passalacqua – investigative reporter (now deceased)
 Cyd Marie Fleming – anchor/reporter (now at WLII-DT)
 Sylvia Gomez – anchor/reporter (now at WKAQ-TV)
 Jennifer Wolff – anchor/reporter (later at WLII-DT and WKAQ-TV)
 Keylla Hernandéz – anchor and reporter (now deceased)
 Zoe Laboy – political analyst (later at WKAQ-TV)
 Luis Francisco Ojeda – investigative reporter (later at WKAQ-AM, now retired)
 Carlos Díaz Olivo – political analyst (now at WKAQ-TV)
 Josue Carrion (later at WTCV and WLII-DT)
 Ivonne Orsini (now at WKAQ-TV)
 Raymond Arrieta (now at WKAQ-TV)
 Johnny Ray Rodriguez – comedian (previously at WKAQ-TV)
 Hector Travieso (later at WKAQ-TV)
 Kobbo Santarrosa (later at WTCV, now at WLII-DT)
 Hector Marcano – Producer & Host at El Super Show'' (later at WLII-DT,WJPX,WKAQ-TV,WIPR-TV and WTCV)
 Topy Mamery (later at WTCV, deceased)
 Roque Gallart (later at WTCV and WLII-DT, now at La Nueva 94 FM)
 Carmen Jovet – reporter (previosly at WKAQ-TV, later at WIPR-TV, now at ABC Puerto Rico)
 Sonya Cortes – (previously at WLII-DT) 
 Gary Rodríguez (now at WLII-DT)
 Gredmarie Colón (previously at WLII-DT)
 Tommy Ramos (previously at Telemundo)
 Efren Arroyo – investigative reporter and historian (previously at WKAQ-TV, deceased)

Technical information

Subchannels
The station's digital signal is multiplexed:

Analog-to-digital conversion
WAPA-TV shut down its analog signal, over VHF channel 4, on June 12, 2009, the official date in which full-power television stations in the United States transitioned from analog to digital broadcasts under federal mandate. The station's digital signal remained on its pre-transition UHF channel 27. Through the use of PSIP, digital television receivers display the station's virtual channel as its former VHF analog channel 4.

References

External links and sources

The Museum of Broadcasting – Puerto Rico TV Profile

Independent television stations in the United States
Mass media in San Juan, Puerto Rico
Superstations in the United States
Television channels and stations established in 1954
1954 establishments in Puerto Rico
Television pioneers
APA-TV